Ceków-Kolonia  is a village in Kalisz County, Greater Poland Voivodeship, in west-central Poland. It is the seat of the gmina (administrative district) called Gmina Ceków-Kolonia.

References

Villages in Kalisz County